The gens Luciena was a minor family at Rome.  Members of this gens are first mentioned in the final century of the Republic.

Origin
The nomen Lucienus appears to belong to a class of names derived from other names, including those of other gentilicia.  It might therefore be derived from the praenomen Lucius, or the corresponding nomen.  Nomina ending in -enus were characteristic of Umbrian.

Members

 Lucienus, a senator, was a friend of Marcus Terentius Varro, and one of the speakers in Varro's dialogue, Rerum Rusticarum.  He is apparently the same person mentioned by Cicero in a letter to Atticus.
 Lucius Lucienus, the father of Lucius Lucienus Rufus.
 Lucius Lucienus L. f. Rufus, a young man buried at Rome.
 Lucius Lucienus Ɔ. l. Diocles, a freedman of the Lucieni, mentioned in the same inscription as Lucius Lucienus Rufus.
 Luciena L. l. Philema, a freedwoman of the Lucieni, mentioned in the same inscription as Lucius Lucienus Rufus.
 Quintus Lucienus Ɔ. l. Dicaeus, a freedman of the Lucieni, mentioned in an inscription at Rome.

See also
 List of Roman gentes

References

Bibliography
 Marcus Terentius Varro, Rerum Rusticarum (Rural Matters).
 Marcus Tullius Cicero, Epistulae ad Atticum.
 Dictionary of Greek and Roman Biography and Mythology, William Smith, ed., Little, Brown and Company, Boston (1849).
 Theodor Mommsen et alii, Corpus Inscriptionum Latinarum (The Body of Latin Inscriptions, abbreviated "CIL"), Berlin-Brandenburgische Akademie der Wissenschaften (1853–present).
 Harper's Dictionary of Classical Literature and Antiquities, Harry Thurston Peck, ed. (Second Edition, 1897).

Roman gentes